Bootsauce was a Juno Award-winning Canadian rock band based in Montreal.  The band was composed of Drew Ling (real name Drew Thorpe) (vocals), Pere Fume (real name Perry Johnson) (guitar), Sonny Greenwich Jr. (guitar), Alan Baculis (bass guitar), and John "Fatboy" Lalley (drums).  Their style combined soul, funk and metal sounds. Two of their albums, The Brown Album and Bull achieved Gold status in Canada.

History
Bootsauce was founded in 1989 in Montreal. The band was nominated for a Juno Award as Most Promising Group in 1991, and received a Juno in 1992 for their 1991 single "Everyone's a Winner", a Hot Chocolate cover.  Their songs were played on MuchMusic.

In 1992, Bootsauce was part of the cross-Canada Big, Bad & Groovy tour organized by MCA Concerts, along with Art Bergman.  That year they released an album, Bull on the band's own label. In 1993, the band released the album Sleeping Bootie. The song "Sorry Whole" was released as a single and reached #1 on the RPM Cancon chart.

Discography
Albums
 The Brown Album (1990), Next Plateau Records
 Bull (1992), Island Records
 Sleeping Bootie (1993), Vertigo Records
 Bootsauce (1995), Polygram
 Bootism: The Bootsauce Collection (1996), Vertigo Records

EPs
 ReBoot (1991, EP), Polygram
 Bum Steer (1992, EP), Polygram
 Byfleet & New Haw (1995, EP), Polygram

Singles
"Masterstroke" (1990)
"Scratching the Whole" (1990)
"Play with Me" (1990)
"Sex Marine" (1991)
"Everyone's a Winner" (1991)
"Love Monkey No.9" (1992)
"Whatcha Need" (1992)
"Big, Bad & Groovy" (1992)
"Rollercoaster's Child" (1992)
"Touching Cloth" (1992)
"Dogpound" (1992)
"Sorry Whole" (1993)
"Automatic" (1993)
"Moanie" (1994)
"Crack of Dawn" (1994)
"Caught Looking at You" (1994)
"Hey Baby" (1995)
"Each Morning After" (1995)
"Payment Time" (1996)

Awards
Bootsauce was nominated as Most Promising Group at the Juno Awards of 1991. At the same ceremony, John W. Stewart was nominated for Best Album Design for The Brown Album.
At the Juno Awards of 1992, "Everyone's a Winner" won the Juno Award for Best Dance Recording.
At the Juno Awards of 1992, John W. Stewart was nominated for Best Album Design for Bull.
At the Juno Awards of 1996, David Andoff, Paul van Dongen, and Tara McVicar were nominated for Best Album Design for Bootsauce.

References

External links
Bootsauce - JAM! Canadian Pop Encyclopedia

1989 establishments in Ontario
Canadian rock music groups
Musical groups established in 1989
Musical groups disestablished in 1996
Musical groups from Montreal
Funk rock musical groups
Juno Award for Dance Recording of the Year winners
English-language musical groups from Quebec
Canadian funk musical groups